Eikwe is a small town in the Ellembelle District of the Western Region of Ghana.

Eikwe is popularly known amongst the  Nzema folks of Ghana for the prominent hospital facility that serve the populace of all the 3 districts in Nzemaland.

The hospital which is one of the biggest in the 3 districts is a  CHAG hospital called St. Martin's de porress hospital.

Eikwe is also known to be one of the fishing communities in Nzemaland with fishing being the primary work of the indigents.

It is located after Sanzule-Krisan and is a branch road off the Esiama -Elubo road. On that stretch, the branch to Eikwe, is at Alabokazo.

References

Populated places in the Western Region (Ghana)